Ifor is a given name. Notable people with the name include:
 Ifor Bach (fl. 1158), 12th-century leader of South Wales
 Ifor Davies (1910–1982), Welsh politician
 Ifor Leslie Evans (1897–1952), Welsh academic
 Ifor James (1931–2004), British horn player and teacher
 Ifor Owen (1915–2007), Welsh educator
 Ifor Pritchard (1940–2010), Welsh artist
 Ifor Williams (1881–1965), Welsh scholar